Paul Thümmel (15 January 1902 – 20 April 1945), aka Agent A-54, was a German double agent who spied for Czechoslovakia during World War II. He was a high-ranking member of the German military intelligence organisation, the Abwehr, and was also a highly decorated member of the National Socialist German Workers Party.

From 1937, Thümmel passed intelligence first to Czechoslovakia and later to the Czechoslovak government-in-exile in London via the Czech underground resistance. He was killed by the SS at the Small Fortress of the Theresienstadt concentration camp in April 1945.

References 

Double agents
Czechoslovak spies
1902 births
1945 deaths
Spies who died in Nazi concentration camps
Abwehr personnel of World War II
World War II spies for Germany
People convicted of spying for Czechoslovakia
People from Mittelsachsen